Bakarkhani or Baqarkhani (Bengali: বাখরখানি/বাকরখানি), also known as bakar khani roti, is a thick, spiced flat-bread that is part of the Mughlai cuisine of Bangladesh. Bakarkhani is prepared on certain Bengali Muslim religious celebrations and is now popular as sweet.Bakharkhani is known as Bakorkhani/Bakorkhani in bengali and it is a huge part of Bengali Muslim culture and cuisine.

Bakorkhani is almost biscuit-like in texture, with a hard crust. The chief ingredients are flour, semolina, sugar, molasses soaked in saffron, poppy or nigella seeds, salt, and ghee (clarified butter).

Legend 

A legend attributes the bread's name to Mirza Agha Baqer, a son-in-law of Murshid Quli Khan II. According to the legend, Baqer, a general based in Chittagong under Nawab Siraj ud-Daulah of Bengal, falls in love with a dancer called Khani Begum from Arambagh, who was also eyed by Zaynul Khan, the city's kotwal and the son of a wazir. Zaynul attempts to attack Khani for rejecting him, and Baker intervenes, defeating Zaynul in a swordfight. Zaynul 's two companions go and lie to his father, the wazir, telling him that Baker has killed Zaynul. Out of fury, the wazir orders them to put Baker inside a cage with a tiger. Baker kills the tiger and at the same time, the claim of Zaynul's death is found to be false. The wazir, Jahandar Khan, and his son Zaynul then kidnap Khani and set off for South Bengal. The battle continues there as Baker arrives to rescue Khani. In another brawl of talwars, Jahandar accidentally kills Zaynul, after Zaynul inadvertently murders Khani. Khani is later buried in Bakla-Chandradwip (Patuakhali-Barisal). Baker Khan builds a tomb over her grave and Bakla-Chandradwip would be renamed Bakerganj after him. Baker was already familiar with this area as he was a jagirdar in Barisal's Salimabad and Umedpur parganas. The tragic love story of Baker Khan and Khani Begum inspired the bakers to name his favourite bread Bakerkhani. Dhaka's first bakorkhani shop opened in close proximity to Lalbagh Fort and many of the city's bakorkhani sellers originate from the Sylhet Division.

The Bengal Subah, specifically Mughal Dhaka, was a hub for merchants from all parts of the subcontinent and even as far as the Middle East and Armenia. Through trade and travel, the bakorkhani became popular outside of Bengal in places such as Kashmir, Bihar, Lucknow and Hyderabad.

Regions

Bakarkhani is popular in the regions of Pakistan, India, Bangladesh, Afghanistan and Russia.

Utsa Ray, a culinary historian, described Bakarkhani as the "pride" of the "gastronomic culture of Dhaka" and according to other scholars, "Bakarkhani gives Old Dhaka a unique and distinct culinary identity". According to Hakim Habibur Rahman, Bakarkhani could not be found in anywhere else than Dhaka during the colonial period.

Preparation 

Bakorkhani is made by kneading together flour, ghee, in some cases cardamom, sugar and salt with water. The dough is then flattened. The bread is made by stretching a sheet of dough repeatedly and interleaving with ghee, molasses, saffron water, poppy or nigella seeds before baking on a tandoor or tawa girdle.

Variations 

It is also known as shukha (meaning 'dry') naan or shukha roti due to its dry texture. Hakim Habibur Rahman, author of Dhaka Panchas Baras Pahle, lists three variations of bakorkhani; Gao-joban, shuki (shukha) and nimshuki. There are also other variations such as kaicha-ruti, mulam and chinshuki.

Outside of Dhaka, different types of Bakarkhani are eaten across the country. The Bakarkhani of Sylhet and Chittagong resemble a sweet and syrupy porota, whilst the Bakarkhani of Dinajpur is thick and doughy and often contains pieces of morobba.

There is also a Kashmiri variant of bakorkhani which is a thinner variety, similar to round naan in appearance, but crisp and layered, and sprinkled with sesame seeds. It is typically consumed hot, during breakfast, often with noon chai.

In literature 

Bakorkhani is mentioned in lines of a Bengali poem by Pratul Mukhopadhyay:

See also 
 List of Indian breads
 List of Pakistani breads

References

Old Dhaka
Bangladeshi cuisine
Pakistani cuisine
Indian cuisine
Bengali cuisine
Awadhi cuisine
Kashmiri cuisine
Flatbreads
Puff pastry
Pastries